Robert Asher could refer to: 

Robert Asher (director) (1915–1979), British film and television director
Robert B. Asher (born 1937), American political figure from Pennsylvania
Bob Asher (American football) (born 1948), American football player